Judge Nevin may refer to:

Jack Nevin (fl. 1990s–2020s), Washington superior court judge and judge of the United States Army Court of Criminal Appeals
Robert Reasoner Nevin (1875–1952), judge of the United States District Court for the Southern District of Ohio